The 2021–22 season was Millwall's 137th year in existence, 95th consecutive season in the Football League, and 45th in the second tier. The club competed in the Championship for the fifth consecutive season and finished ninth. Millwall had a chance of making the play-offs right down the last game day, but ultimately missed out by six points. The team also played in the FA Cup and League Cup, and were knocked out in the early rounds.

First-team squad

Statistics

Players with names in italics and marked * were on loan from another club for the whole of their season with Millwall.

|-
!colspan=15|Players out on loan:

|-
!colspan=15|Players who left the club:

|}

Goals record

Disciplinary record

Transfers

Transfers in

Loans in

Loans out

Transfers out

Pre-season and friendlies
As part of their pre-season preparations, Millwall announced friendly matches against Gillingham and Ipswich Town.

Competitions

Overview

EFL Championship

League table

Results summary

Results by matchday

Matches
Millwall's fixtures were announced on 24 June 2021.

FA Cup

Millwall were drawn at home to Crystal Palace in the third round.

EFL Cup

Millwall were drawn at home to Portsmouth in the first round Cambridge United in the second round and Leicester City in the third round.

Notes

References

10. https://www.millwallfc.co.uk/news/2021/june2/millwall-youngsters-extend-stay-at-the-den/

External links

Millwall F.C. seasons
Millwall F.C.
Millwall
Millwall